Michael Dennis LaFleur (born March 3, 1987) is an American football coach who is the offensive  coordinator for the Los Angeles Rams of the National Football League (NFL). He previously has served as an assistant coach for the Atlanta Falcons, the Cleveland Browns and the San Francisco 49ers, and as offensive coordinator of the New York Jets.

Playing career
Mike LaFleur attended Elmhurst College and played quarterback for the Bluejays in 2006 and 2007. LaFleur started all ten games at safety for the Bluejays in 2008. He was a team captain and a three-time letter winner at Elmhurst.

Coaching career

Early years
Mike LaFleur started his coaching career in 2009 as an offensive assistant for the Elmhurst Bluejays. LaFleur next coached at Saint Joseph's from 2010 to 2012 before accepting an offensive coordinator position with Davidson in 2013.

Cleveland Browns 
LaFleur accepted his first NFL position as an offensive intern in 2014 for the Cleveland Browns under offensive coordinator Kyle Shanahan.

Atlanta Falcons
LaFleur followed Shanahan to Atlanta for the 2015 and 2016 seasons as an offensive assistant.

San Francisco 49ers
Upon Kyle Shanahan's promotion to the head coach of the 49ers, LaFleur accepted a position as the passing game coordinator and wide receivers position coach for the San Francisco 49ers in 2017. LaFleur served in the dual role for two years before losing his wide receivers coach designation in 2019, upon Shanahan's addition of Wes Welker to his coaching staff. That season, LaFleur helped coach the 49ers to an NFC Championship, and before the Super Bowl, ESPN's Adam Schefter reported that LaFleur agreed to a contract extension with San Francisco.

New York Jets
LaFleur followed Robert Saleh from the 49ers to become the Jets' offensive coordinator in 2021. The Jets under his offense with rookie quarterback Zach Wilson went 4–13.  After starting the 2022/2023 season with 7 wins and 4 losses, the team proceeded to lose six straight games, ending the campaign at 7-10 and missing the playoffs for an NFL high 12 straight years. In the last three games of that six game losing streak, the team failed to score a single touchdown.

Los Angeles Rams
On January 27, 2023, LaFleur was hired as an offensive coordinator for the Los Angeles Rams.

Personal life
He is the younger brother of Matt LaFleur, the current head coach of the Green Bay Packers. LaFleur married his wife, Lauren, in July 2010. The couple have two children.

References

External links

 New York Jets profile

1987 births
Living people
Players of American football from Michigan
American football quarterbacks
Elmhurst Bluejays football players
American football safeties
Coaches of American football from Michigan
Elmhurst Bluejays football coaches
Saint Joseph's Pumas football coaches
Davidson Wildcats football coaches
Cleveland Browns coaches
Atlanta Falcons coaches
San Francisco 49ers coaches
New York Jets coaches
Los Angeles Rams coaches
National Football League offensive coordinators
American people of French descent
People from Mount Pleasant, Michigan